Liam Rushe (born 18 June 1990) is an Irish hurler who currently plays as a centre back for the Dublin senior team.

Rushe made his first appearance for the team during the 2009 championship and has become a regular member of the starting fifteen since then. During that time he has won one Leinster Senior Hurling Championship winner's medal (2013) one National Hurling League winner's medal and has been a runner-up in two Leinster finals.

At club level Rushe plays with St Patrick's, Palmerstown. Rushe did both his primary and secondary schooling through Irish. He is a fluent Irish speaker and does match commentary work with TG4.

Playing career

Club

As a member of the St Patrick's, Palmerstown club, he won a county club 'B' championship title in 2008.

Minor and under-21

Rushe first came to prominence on the inter-county scene in 2007 as a member of the Dublin minor hurling team in 2007. He won a Leinster title that year following a 2-14 to 1-10 defeat of Kilkenny.

By 2010 Rushe had joined the Dublin under-21 hurling team. He won a Leinster title in that grade that year following a 2-15 to 0-15 defeat of Wexford.

Rushe's side retained their provincial title in 2011 following another comprehensive defeat of Wexford. He was named man of the match for his performance in that game. Dublin later played in the All-Ireland final against Galway, however, they were beaten by 3-14 to 1-10.

Senior

Rushe had recently finished up with the minor grade team when he made his senior championship debut at full-forward in a Leinster quarter-final game against Antrim. The Dublin team subsequently qualified for a first Leinster final in eighteen years. However Kilkenny won the match with a 2-18 to 0-18 score line.

After a disappointing championship in 2010, Dublin qualified for the National Hurling League final in 2011, their first decider in over seventy years. A 0-22 to 1-7 victory over Kilkenny gave Rushe a National League winners' medal. Dublin and Kilkenny would play again in the Leinster final that day, however, the result was reversed on this occasion. A 4-17 to 1-15 score line gave victory to Kilkenny. In spite of this defeat Dublin remained in the championship and reached an All-Ireland semi-final against reigning All-Ireland champions Tipperary. However, Tipperary narrowly won by 1-19 to 0-18. Rushe finished off the season by winning his very first All-Star award while he was also named All-Stars Young Hurler of the Year.

Honours
Dublin
Leinster Senior Hurling Championship (1): 2013
Leinster Under-21 Hurling Championship (2): 2010, 2011
Leinster Minor Hurling Championship (1): 2007
National Hurling League (1): 2011
National Hurling Division 1B (1): 2013

St Patrick's Palmerstown
Dublin Senior B Hurling Championship (1): 2008

Leinster
Interprovincial Championship (1): 2012

Personal
All-Star Awards (2): 2011, 2013
All Stars Young Hurler of the Year (1): 2011

References

1990 births
Living people
Dublin inter-county hurlers
Gaelic games writers and broadcasters
Irish accountants
St Patrick's (Palmerstown) hurlers